SpoIVB peptidase (sporulation factor IV B protease) is an enzyme. This enzyme catalyses the following chemical reaction

 Self-cleaves Val52-Asn53, Ala62-Phe63 and Val74-Thr75 at the N-terminus of SpoIVB

This enzyme participates in gene expression during the later stages of spore formation in Bacillus subtilis.

References

External links 
 

EC 3.4.21